Stachystemon is a plant genus in the family Picrodendraceae first described as a genus in 1845.

The entire genus is endemic to the State of Western Australia.

species

See also
Taxonomy of the Picrodendraceae

References

Picrodendraceae
Malpighiales genera
Endemic flora of Australia
Taxa named by Jules Émile Planchon